Cwmllynfell railway station served the village of Cwmllynfell, in the historical county of Glamorganshire, Wales, from 1896 to 1964 on the Swansea Vale Railway.

History 
The station was opened as Gwaun-Cae-Gurwen Colliers Platform on 7 December 1896 by the Swansea Vale Railway, although it didn't appear in the timetable. It appeared in the timetable on 1 July 1909 and its name was changed to Cwmllynfell. The station closed to passengers on 25 September 1950 and closed to goods on 28 September 1964.

References 

Disused railway stations in Neath Port Talbot
Railway stations in Great Britain opened in 1896
Railway stations in Great Britain closed in 1950
1896 establishments in Wales
1964 disestablishments in Wales
Former Midland Railway stations